Surender Singh Barwala (born 2 August 1951) has been elected the Member of Parliament from Hisar constituency in 12th and 13th Lok Sabha, the lower house of Indian Parliament.

He was born in village Sangatpura, Jind district in Haryana, he did his B.A. from Dyal Singh College, Karnal, followed by L. L. B. from Kurukshetra Law College, Kurukshetra University.

He has defeated heavy weights and business tycoon from Haryana Om Prakash Jindal of Jindal Steel Industries and Congress Stalwarts like Brinder Singh, Jaiprakash. He has also been elected to Vidhan Sabha from Barwala in 1987 and was made the Forest Minister and later Education Minister. He was in Indian National Lok Dal a regional outfit. He is now in Bhartiya Janta Party and contested for MLA from Jind Stood second by a narrow margin of 2,000 votes. He joined the party in presence  of BJP President Amit Shah and Health Minister Govt. Of India Shri J.P.Nadda on 12 September 2014.  

On 6 June 2020, an FIR was registered with the Delhi Police against his son Prashant Barwala who is allegedly accused by a woman for raping her and impregnating her on the promise of marrying her and getting her a job. The victim later approached Delhi High Court to get police protection, which was granted to her as she was allegedly being threatened by the Barwala family. 

On 15 July 2022, an FIR was registered with the Haryana Police against his sister-in-law Dr. Renu Malik and others for allegedly forging the ‘Will of Inheritance’ of her mother-in-law Late. Nirmla Malik and using it as genuine, in collusion with her husband Vineet Malik and father-in-law Randhir Singh Malik.

References 

1951 births
Living people
Lok Sabha members from Haryana
India MPs 1998–1999
India MPs 1999–2004
Indian National Lok Dal politicians
Members of the Haryana Legislative Assembly
State cabinet ministers of Haryana
People from Jind district
Bharatiya Janata Party politicians from Haryana